Geoffrey Berens (born 6 April 1983) is a Dutch karateka. He is a two-time silver medalist in the men's kumite 60 kg event at the World Karate Championships, both in 2014 and 2016.
In 2017, he represented the Netherlands at the World Games in the men's kumite 60 kg event without winning a medal. This also marked the end of his sports career.

Achievements

References

External links 
 

Living people
1983 births
Place of birth missing (living people)
Dutch male karateka
Competitors at the 2017 World Games
21st-century Dutch people